Bitterbark or bitter bark is a common name for several species of plants and may refer to:

Alstonia constricta, an Australian shrub
Simarouba amara, a neotropical tree
Petalostigma triloculare, the long leaved bitter bark, an Australian tree
Sacoglottis gabonensis, a tree from Western to Central Africa